Renato Cunha Valle (born December 5, 1944 in Rio de Janeiro), better known as Renato, is a former footballer who played as a goalkeeper.

He played for Flamengo (1964, 1967–68 and 1972–75), Taubaté (1965), Entrerriense (1966), Uberlândia (1969), Clube Atlético Mineiro (1970–1972), Fluminense (1975–1979) and Bahia (1979–1982).

Renato won a Brazilian championship title in 1971 whilst with Atletico Mineiro.

He made a total of two appearances for the Brazil national football team (both in 1973), and he also made the Brazilian squad for the 1974 FIFA World Cup.

References

1944 births
Living people
Footballers from Rio de Janeiro (city)
Brazilian footballers
Association football goalkeepers
CR Flamengo footballers
Clube Atlético Mineiro players
Fluminense FC players
1974 FIFA World Cup players
Brazil international footballers